Muizenberg is the name of a city in South Africa. It may also refer to:

 Muizenberg (Curaçao), a wetland in the city of Willemstad on the Dutch Caribbean island of Curaçao